Run the Length of Your Wildness is the first album by Kathe Green. It was originally released by Deram Records, a sister label to Decca Records.

Green wrote 10 of the album's 13 tracks and she was teamed up with in-house producer and head of A&R at Deram, Wayne Bickerton, arranger John Cameron and the cream of London session players. Four tracks were co-written with Liz Sacks.  Cameron and Bickerton also provided material.

The album was housed in a striking sleeve which featured notes by Peter Sellers, Rex Harrison and Simon Dee.

Track listing
All tracks composed by Kathe Green; except where indicated
 "Primrose Hill" (Green, Liz Sacks) – 3:47
 "Ring of String" – 3:25
 "Only a Fool" (Jackie Lomax, Wayne Bickerton) – 2:17
 "Why? (The Child's Song)" – 1:51
 "Bossa Nova" – 1:53
 "Tears in My Eyes" (Tony Waddington, Wayne Bickerton) – 3:04
 "If I Thought You'd Ever Change Your Mind" (John Cameron) – 3:10
 "Promise of Something New" (Green, Glenn Close) – 2:38
 "Once There Was You" (Green, Liz Sacks) – 2:43
 "Part of Yesterday" (Green, Liz Sacks) – 3:46
 "I'll Never Forget" (John Cameron) – 2:54
 "Run the Length of Your Wildness" (Green, Liz Sacks, John Cameron) – 5:16
 "I Love You ('Though You Are Not Here)" (Green, Pat Lewis) – 0:43

Personnel
John Cameron - musical direction
Derek Varnals - engineer
Peter Rynston - assistant engineer
Terence Ibbott - photography

1969 debut albums
Deram Records albums
Albums conducted by John Cameron (musician)
Albums arranged by John Cameron (musician)
Kathe Green albums